Estrangeiro is a 1989 album by the Brazilian singer Caetano Veloso. It was produced by Peter Scherer and Arto Lindsay and features Naná Vasconcelos, Carlinhos Brown, Bill Frisell and Marc Ribot. Robert Christgau named it 27th on "The 1989 Pazz & Jop Critics Poll" of best albums released in that year.

Track listing

Personnel
Caetano Veloso: vocals, acoustic guitar (on tracks 3, 8, 10) 
Peter Scherer: keyboards (on 1–7, 9)
Arto Lindsay: guitar (on 1, 3–5, 9) and voice (on 4)
Bill Frisell: guitar (on 1, 6)
Marc Ribot: guitar (on 1, 7)
Toni Costa: guitar (on 2, 9) and acoustic guitar (on 10)
Tavinho Fialho: bass (on 2, 9)
Tony Lewis: drums (on 1)
Cesinha: drums (on 2, 9)
Naná Vasconcelos: percussion (on 1, 5–8)
Carlinhos Brown: percussion (on 2, 4, 9)

References

1989 albums
Caetano Veloso albums